"Goodbye, My Love, Goodbye" is a song by Greek singer Demis Roussos. It was released as a single in 1973.

The song was included on Roussos' 1973 album Forever and Ever.

Background and writing 
The song was written by Leo Leandros and Klaus Munro. The recording was produced by Leo Leandros.

There is also a Czech-language, a German-language version by the same name, as well as a Spanish-language version titled "Adiós, mi amor, adiós".

Commercial performance 
The song reached no. 1 in Germany, Switzerland, Belgium (Flanders), and Spain.

Track listings 
7" single Philips 6009 318 (1973, Germany, Ireland)
7" single RTB S 53695 (1973, Yugoslavia)
 A. "Goodbye, My Love, Goodbye" (3:58)
 B. "Mara" (3:59)

7" single Philips 6009 392 (1973, Italy)
 A. "Goodbye, My Love, Goodbye" (3:56)
 B. "My Friend The Wind" (3:55)

7" single Philips 6009 364 (1973, Netherlands)
 A. "Goodbye, My Love, Goodbye" (3:58)
 B. "No Way Out" (3:10)

7" single Philips 6009 381 (1973, France, Portugal)
 A. "Goodbye, My Love, Goodbye" (3:56)
 B. "Yellow Paper" (3:04)

7" single Philips 60 09 400 (1973, Spain)
 A. "Goodbye, My Love, Goodbye" (3:56)
 B. "Lay It Down" (3:45)

Charts 

 Charted posthumously in 2015

See also 
 List of number-one singles of 1974 (Spain)
 List of number-one singles from 1968 to 1979 (Switzerland)

References 

1973 songs
1973 singles
Demis Roussos songs
Philips Records singles
Number-one singles in Spain
Number-one singles in Germany
Number-one singles in Switzerland
Ultratop 50 Singles (Flanders) number-one singles
Song recordings produced by Leo Leandros
Songs written by Leo Leandros